During World War II, the industrial town of Essen, was a target of Allied strategic bombing.
The Krupp steelworks was an important industrial target, Essen was a "primary target" designated for area bombing by the February 1942 British Area bombing directive.

As part of the campaign in 1943 known as the Battle of the Ruhr, Essen was a regular target.

The Germans built large-scale night-time decoys like the Krupp decoy site (German: Kruppsche Nachtscheinanlage) which was a copy of the Krupp steel works in Essen. During World War II, it was designed to divert Allied airstrikes from the actual production site of the arms factory.

In the period 1939 to 1945 the Royal Air Force (RAF) dropped a total of 36,429 long tons of bombs on Essen.

Bombing

References
Notes

Bibliography
 March 1942, July 1942, August 1942, September 1942, October 1942, November 1942, December 1942, January 1943, February 1943, March 1943, April 1943

Further reading

External links
Al Murray's Road to Berlin, Episode 6, "examine[s] in detail the RAF’s efforts to destroy the German Krupp armament factories in Essen in the Ruhr Valley, and the raid of 23 October 1944"

Essen
Krupp
Essen
Germany–United Kingdom military relations